LAD Square is a metro station on the Aqua Line of the Nagpur Metro. It was opened on 22 October 2020.

Station Layout

References

Nagpur Metro stations
Railway stations in India opened in 2020